Vels may refer to:

Cornelis Vels (1867–1963), South African cricketer
Verna Vels (1933–2014), South African novelist
Vels (river), river in Russia
Vels University, university in Chennai, India
The Vels, American New Wave musical group
Vels, chieftains of early historic south India

See also
Victorian Essential Learning Standards
Vel (disambiguation)